Château de Campagne is a château in Dordogne, Aquitaine, France.

Between the lavoir and the church is the entrance to the Chateau of Campagne. This splendid building was built in the 12th century and burnt down in the 15th century. The current building was built in the 15, 17 and 18th century.

In 1970 the castle was given to the state by the Marquis de Campagne and in recent years it has been beautifully renovated. The castle is not open to visitors but its beautiful grounds have also been restored and improved and are free to visit.

The grounds were originally laid out in the style of English Country gardens of the 19th century and contain some magnificent trees including huge redwoods and cedar trees. Recently the edges of a stream winding through the garden have been attractively planted and the walk along the stream and round the grounds is a treat.

There is also a decorative vegetable garden and a labyrinth to explore in the gardens. The walk around the gardens and grounds offers views of all sides of the beautiful chateau with its decorative towers and roofs.

The agricultural buildings of the castle have also been renovated and these are now used by the International Prehistory Centre.

The park covers 6 hectares and opens onto a forest of 367 hectares part of which is a classified Biological Reserve.

References

--- Source: France this way

Châteaux in Dordogne